Relations between neighbours Jordan and Syria have ancient roots as both countries are historically parts of the Levant or Greater Syria. The two states were created after the First World War from former Ottoman dominions by way of a secret bilateral agreement between Britain and France.

Proposals to unify Jordan and Syria

1921 to 1946

In 1921, the founder of the Emirate of Transjordan, Abdallah, sought to advance into Syria, from which his brother had been expelled by the French, and which he regarded as part of the promised Hashemite kingdom. Even as late as 1946, when both countries gained independence, King Abdallah did not abandon his plan to become king of Syria. Syria considered Abdallah's schemes for an expanded Hashimite kingdom as intervention in its domestic affairs and officially complained to the Arab League.

1960 to 1979
Jordanian-Syrian tensions were exacerbated in the late 1960s, following the rift between Jordan and the PLO, with Syria supporting the Palestinians against Jordan. In September 1970, Syria sent an armored division into Jordan to reinforce the Palestinian forces under attack by Hussein's army. By July 1971, Syria had broken off diplomatic relations with Jordan over the issue.

Yom Kippur War
The October 1973 War resulted in a gradual improvement in relations, as Jordan contributed to the Syrian military effort; In 1976 Jordan was the only Arab country to support the Syrian invasion and subsequent role in Lebanon. However, another break between Syria and Jordan occurred in 1977, following Jordan's tacit support for Egyptian President Sadat's peace initiative. During this period Syria charged Jordan with harboring members of the Muslim Brotherhood, who had escaped from Syria.

The 1980s
This charge led to new tension in December 1980, with military forces of both sides deployed along the border. As a counterweight to Syria, Jordan improved its relations with Iraq, and became one of its primary suppliers. In 1981 Jordan accused Syria of being behind the kidnapping of the Jordanian military attaché in Beirut and charged Rifaat al-Assad, President Assad's brother, with masterminding a plot to assassinate the Jordanian prime minister. By the mid-1980s, rapprochement efforts were again underway.

1990-2011
After the first Gulf War relations between Jordan and Syria had improved. After the Treaty of Peace Between the State of Israel and the Hashemite Kingdom of Jordan in which Jordan established diplomatic ties with Israel (the only Arab country other than Egypt to do so), Jordan has been an important transit point for Syrian businessmen doing business in the Palestinian territories.

The Syrian Civil War

In 2012, relations became somewhat strained due to the Syrian civil war; reports emerged of Jordanian forces clashing with Syrian forces along the border.

On 26 May 2014, Jordan expelled Syrian ambassador Bahjat Suleiman who, according to Jordanian Foreign Ministry spokeswoman Sabah al-Rafie, was declared persona non grata because of "continued offensive statements, through his personal contacts or writing in the media and the social media, against the kingdom."

Jordan is part of the American-led intervention in Syria, and has established a "special working mechanism" to coordinate its involvement there with the Russian military intervention in the Syrian Civil War.

Although Jordan initially supported the moderate rebel coalition known as the Southern Front, it later pressured the United States to freeze the CIA's armament support for them. Jordan is said to support the Revolutionary Commando Army, but has stated the objective of that group is to fight the Islamic State of Iraq and the Levant, not the Syrian government.

See also
 Battle of Maysalun
 Bilad ash-Sham
 Fertile Crescent Plan
 Foreign relations of Jordan
 Foreign relations of Syria
 Jordan–Syria border
 Levant Quartet
 Sykes-Picot Agreement

References

Further reading
 

 
Syria
Bilateral relations of Syria